Hüseyin Öztürk (born 1928) is a Turkish former basketball player.

Turkish national team
As a member of the senior Turkish national basketball team, Öztürk led the 1949 EuroBasket in scoring average, at 19.3 points per game. His performance earned him the tournament's MVP award, as Turkey finished the tournament in fourth place.

External links
Fiba.com profile

1928 births
Possibly living people
Turkish men's basketball players
Forwards (basketball)